Stay Gold is the eighth full-length studio album from American musician Butch Walker, released on August 26, 2016 through DangerBird records in the United States and Lojinx in Europe. The album was announced in June of that year with the lead single “East Coast Girl”.

Following his previous release, Afraid of Ghosts, an emotional album recorded after the loss of his father, Stay Gold presents a much more upbeat and optimistic outlook, with Walker saying "I spilled it all out on [Afraid of Ghosts] and it was a heavy subject. Where do you go from there? [...] It triggered a lot of bittersweet nostalgia. So I started writing about all that, and it sounded like the template should be more of a celebration, as far as the music goes."

Background and production

Walker cites the 1983 film The Outsiders as a major thematic influence for the record, echoing his own small town childhood, with the title referencing the line spoken by Johnny Cade to Ponyboy Curtis, "Stay gold, Ponyboy. Stay gold."

Track listing

Personnel
Credits adapted from AllMusic.

Musicians
 Ryan Adams – guitar, piano
 Daniel Donato – guitar
 Gavin Fitzjohn – horn
 Roger Manning – keyboards, piano, background vocals
 Ashley Monroe – vocals
 Steven "Doc" Patt – accordion, bass guitar, upright bass, slide guitar, background vocals
 Suzanne Santo – violin, background vocals
 Mark Stepro – drums, background vocals
 Butch Walker – bass guitar, guitar, keyboards, organ, percussion, piano, vocals

Technical personnel
 Michael Brauer – mixing
 Pete Lyman – mastering
 Todd Stopera – engineer

Charts

References 

Butch Walker albums
2016 albums
Albums produced by Butch Walker
Lojinx albums
Dangerbird Records albums